Nikos Beloyannis (1915 – 30 March 1952) was a Greek resistance leader and leading cadre of the Greek Communist Party.

Biography 
Beloyannis was born in Amaliada (Peloponnese, Greece) in 1915. He came from a relatively prosperous family and went on to study law in Athens, but before being able to graduate, he was arrested and jailed in the Akronauplia prison (Nauplion) by the Ioannis Metaxas regime in the 1930s and transferred to the Germans after the Axis occupation of Greece (1941). He escaped in 1943 and joined the Greek People's Liberation Army (ELAS) in Peloponnese in the side of Aris Velouchiotis. After becoming Political Commissioner of the Democratic Army of Greece (DSE) during the Greek Civil War, he was one of the last to leave the country (1949) after its defeat. 

In June 1950, Beloyannis returned to Greece in order to re-establish the Athens organization of the Communist Party of Greece (KKE) that had been declared illegal. He was arrested on 20 December 1950 and was taken before a court-martial on charges of violating Compulsory Law 509/1947, which criminalized KKE. He was accused of treason, allegedly having transmitted information to the Soviet Union. The Beloyannis trial started in Athens on 19 October 1951. In total, 94 people were accused. One of the three members of the court-martial was Georgios Papadopoulos who later (1967) became the leader of the military dictatorship of 1967-1974. Beloyannis denied all accusations and stressed the patriotic nature of his actions during the anti-Nazi resistance (1941—1944), the British intervention (1944–1946) and the Greek Civil War (1946–1949). He became globally known as the "Man with the Carnation" and as such, he was depicted in a famous Pablo Picasso sketch. Beloyannis made an impassioned defense of the achievements of the resistance and exposed the fact that in the postwar years people who had fought the Nazis were persecuted for their left-wing views, while Nazi collaborators were rewarded with posts in the Greek government due to the Cold War atmosphere.

Despite national and international appeals for clemency, between 15–16 November, the court-martial sentenced Beloyannis and eleven of his comrades to death. On 1 March 1952, Beloyannis and seven others were sentenced to death. Within a week the Greek government received from all over the world hundreds of thousands telegrams against the death sentence, while an international campaign -- with the participation of personalities like Picasso, Charlie Chaplin, Jean Paul Sartre, Paul Éluard, Nazim Hikmet and others -- asked for the cancellation of the military tribune's verdict. Four prisoners were taken from Kallithea on the early morning of Sunday, 30 March 1952, and executed in the Goudi camp. The sentences of the other co-defendants of Beloyannis were commuted to life imprisonment, and by the mid-1960s,all were released from prison.

Beloyannis became one of the great heroes of the Greek resistance, and a symbolic victim of the authoritarian post-war establishment. His name was given to the village of Beloiannisz, Hungary, which housed Greek political refugees who lived in exile from the end of the civil war (1949) until they were allowed to return to Greece by the first Andreas Papandreou government in the early 1980s.

Writings 
In his last letter, written from death-row, Beloyannis mentions two books that he appears to have written on the economic development of Greece and the country's history of literature. The manuscripts of the former were published in 2010 under the title Foreign Capital in Greece (Το Ξένο Κεφάλαιο στην Ελλάδα, To Kseno Kefaleo stin Ellada). Through the detailed analysis of Greece's external borrowing, its history is presented as one of subjection to foreign powers and financial institutions who ended up controlling most of its economy and resources to the dismay of the working class.

Cultural references 
 Pablo Picasso created a sketch named The Man with the Carnation honouring Beloyannis, inspired by a portrait of him.
 Peter de Francia painted The Execution of Beloyannis in 1953. It was sold to a private collector in 2011 by James Hyman Gallery It has since become part of the Tate collection.
 Nikos Tzimas' movie The Man with the Carnation (1980).
 Turkish poet Nâzım Hikmet wrote a poem called The Man with the Carnation in 1952 about Beloyannis.

See also 
 Elli Pappa (1920-2009), Greek writer and activist, partner of Nikos Beloyannis
 Beloiannisz, a village in Hungary named after him

References

External links 

1915 births
1952 deaths
People from Amaliada
Greek atheists
Stalinism
Anti-revisionists
Communist Party of Greece politicians
Greek People's Liberation Army personnel
Democratic Army of Greece personnel
Exiles of the Greek Civil War
History of Greece (1949–1974)
Prisoners sentenced to death by Greece
Executed Greek people
People executed by Greece by firing squad
People executed for treason against Greece
20th-century executions by Greece